The grey-hooded babbler (Cyanoderma bicolor) is a babbler species in the family Timaliidae. It occurs in Borneo and Banggai Island. The grey-hooded babbler was formerly considered conspecific to the chestnut-winged babbler (Cyanoderma erythropterum). It is listed as Least Concern on the IUCN Red List.

References

grey-hooded babbler
grey-hooded babbler
grey-hooded babbler